The Kenya Clinical Officers Association (KCOA) is a professional medical association whose membership is open to all clinical officers who are registered by the Clinical Officers Council and are licensed to practice medicine in Kenya.

Healthcare trade unions in Kenya